Erik Erland Lindén (July 28, 1880 – September 16, 1952) was a Swedish sailor who competed in the 1912 Summer Olympics. In 1912 he was a crew member of the Swedish boat Marga which finished fourth in the 10 metre class competition.

References

1880 births
1952 deaths
Swedish male sailors (sport)
Olympic sailors of Sweden
Sailors at the 1912 Summer Olympics – 10 Metre